Rockall is an uninhabitable granite islet situated in the North Atlantic Ocean. The United Kingdom claims that Rockall lies within its territorial sea and is part of its territory, but this claim is not recognised by Ireland. It and the nearby skerries of Hasselwood Rock and Helen's Reef are the only emergent parts of the Rockall Plateau. The rock was formed by magmatism as part of the North Atlantic Igneous Province during the Paleogene.

The nearest permanently inhabited place is North Uist, an island in the Outer Hebrides of Scotland,  to the east.

The United Kingdom claimed Rockall in 1955 and incorporated it as a part of Scotland in 1972. The UK does not make a claim to extended EEZ based on Rockall, as it has ratified the United Nations Convention on the Law of the Sea (UNCLOS), which says that "rocks which cannot sustain human habitation or economic life of their own shall have no exclusive economic zone or continental shelf". However, such features are entitled to a territorial sea extending . Ireland's position is that Rockall does not even generate a 12-nautical-mile territorial sea for the United Kingdom owing to the UK's uncertain title to Rockall. Ireland does not recognize the UK's claim, although it has never sought to claim sovereignty of Rockall for itself. The consistent position of successive Irish governments has been that Rockall and similar rocks and skerries have no significance for establishing legal claims to mineral rights in the adjacent seabed or to fishing rights in the surrounding seas.

Etymology
The origin and meaning of the islet's name Rockall is uncertain. The Scottish Gaelic name for the islet, may derive from an Old Norse name that may contain the element , meaning 'mountain'. Another idea is that it derives from the Gaelic , meaning 'skerry of roaring' or 'sea rock of roaring' (although  can also be translated as 'tearing' or 'ripping').

The first literary reference to the island, which is called Rokol, is found in Martin Martin's A Description of the Western Isles of Scotland, published in 1703. This book gives an account of a voyage to the archipelago of St Kilda, and Martin states: "... and from it lies Rokol, a small rock  to the westward of St Kilda; the inhabitants of this place call it Rokabarra."

The name  is also used in Scottish Gaelic folklore for a mythical rock which is supposed to appear three times, its last appearance being at the end of the world: "". ('When Rocabarra returns, the world will likely come to be destroyed').

Rockall's name has also been used in Irish mythology; one story describes how legendary giant Fionn mac Cumhaill (Finn McCool) scooped up a chunk of Ireland to fling at a Scottish rival. It instead missed and landed in the Irish Sea – the pebble left behind formed Rockall, while the clump became the Isle of Man and the void left behind filled with water and eventually became Lough Neagh.

History

The  rock has been noted in written records since the late 16th century. In the 20th century, its location became relevant due to potential oil and fishing rights that might accrue to a nation recognized as having a legitimate claim to it.

In 1955 the British landed on Rockall and claimed it for the United Kingdom. The United Kingdom formally annexed the islet in 1972. According to Ian Mitchell, Rockall was terra nullius (owned by no one) until the 1955 British claim was made.

Rockall gives its name to one of the sea areas named in the shipping forecast provided by the British Meteorological Office.

Rockall has been a point of interest for adventurers and amateur radio operators, who have variously landed on or briefly occupied the islet. Fewer than 20 individuals have ever been confirmed to have landed on Rockall, and the longest known continuous occupation is 45 days (achieved in 2014 by a solo person). In a House of Commons debate in 1971, William Ross, Labour MP for Kilmarnock, said: "More people have landed on the moon than have landed on Rockall" (however only twelve people have landed on the moon, so while possibly true at the time, it is no longer correct.)

Recorded visits to Rockall

The earliest recorded date of landing on the island is often given as 8 July 1810, when a Royal Navy officer named Basil Hall led a small landing party from the frigate  to the summit. However, research by James Fisher (see below), in the log of Endymion and elsewhere, indicates that the actual date for this first landing was on Sunday 8 September 1811.

The landing party left Endymion for the rock by boat. Whilst there, Endymion, which was taking depth measurements around Rockall, lost visual contact with the rock as a haze descended. The ship drifted away, leaving the landing party stranded. The expedition made a brief attempt to return to the ship, but could not find the frigate in the haze, and soon gave up and returned to Rockall. After the haze became a fog, the lookout sent to the top of Rockall spotted the ship again, but it turned away from Rockall before the expedition in their boats reached it. Finally, just before sunset, the frigate was again spotted from the top of Rockall, and the expedition was able to get back on board. The crew of Endymion reported that they had been searching for five or six hours, firing their cannon every ten minutes. Hall related this experience and other adventures in a book entitled Fragment of Voyages and Travels Including Anecdotes of a Naval Life.

The next landing, in the summer of 1862, was by a Mr Johns of HMS Porcupine whilst the ship was making a survey of the sea bed prior to the laying of a transatlantic telegraph cable. Johns managed to gain foothold on the island, but failed to reach the summit.

British annexation 

The annexation of Rockall was announced by the Admiralty on 21 September 1955.

The expedition team cemented in a brass plaque on Hall's Ledge and hoisted the Union Flag to stake the UK's claim. The inscription on the plaque read:
 It was the final territorial expansion of the British empire.

The initial incentive for the annexation was the test-firing of the UK's first guided nuclear weapon, the American-made Corporal missile. The missile was to be launched from South Uist and sent over the North Atlantic. The Ministry of Defence was concerned that the unclaimed island would provide an opportunity for the Soviet Union to spy on the test. Consequently, in April 1955 an order was issued to the Admiralty to seize the island and declare UK sovereignty, lest it become an outpost for foreign observers.

On 7 November 1955, J. Abrach Mackay, a member of the Clan Mackay, made a protest about the annexation; the 84-year-old local councillor declared: "My old father, God rest his soul, claimed that island for the Clan of Mackay in 1846 and I now demand that the Admiralty hand it back. It's no' theirs'." The British Government ignored the protests, which were soon forgotten.

In 1971, Captain T R Kirkpatrick RE led the landing party on a government expedition named "Operation Top Hat" that was mounted from RFA Engadine to establish that the rock was part of the United Kingdom and to prepare the islet for the installation of a light beacon. The landing party included Royal Engineers, Royal Marines and civilian members from the Institute of Geological Sciences in London. The party was landed by winch line from the Wessex 5 helicopters of the Royal Naval Air Services Commando Headquarters Squadron, commanded by Lt Cmdr Neil Foster RN. As well as collecting samples of the aegerine granite, rockallite, for later analysis in London, the top of the rock was blown off using a newly developed blasting technique, Precision Pre-Splitting. This created a level area that was drilled to take the anchorages for the light beacon that was installed the following year. Two phosphor bronze plates were chased into the wall above Hall's Ledge, each secured by four 80-tonne rock-anchor bolts; there was no evidence of the brass plate installed in 1955.

Establishing that the rock is part of the United Kingdom and its development as a light beacon facilitated the incorporation of the island into the District of Harris in the County of Inverness in the Island of Rockall Act 1972 and reinforced the UK Government's position with regard to seabed rights in the area.

In 1978, eight members of the Dangerous Sports Club, including David Kirke, one of its founders, held a cocktail party on the island, allegedly leaving with the plaque.

Former SAS member and survival expert Tom McClean lived on the island from 26 May 1985 to 4 July 1985 to affirm the UK's claim to the islet.

Waveland 

In 1997, the environmentalist organisation Greenpeace occupied the islet for a short time, calling it Waveland, to protest against oil exploration. Greenpeace declared the island to be a "new Global State" (as a spoof micronation) and offered citizenship to anyone willing to take their pledge of allegiance. The British Government's response was to state that "Rockall is British territory. It is part of Scotland and anyone is free to go there and can stay as long as they please" and otherwise ignore them. During his one night on Rockall, Greenpeace protester and Guardian journalist John Vidal unscrewed the 1955 plaque and re-fixed it back-to-front. Micronation continued after leaving the island until 1999.

Recent visits 
In June 2005 the first amateur radio (ham radio) activation of Rockall took place when the club station MS0IRC/P was set up and operated for a few hours on HF frequencies before they had to close down due to approaching bad weather. The IOTA number EU-189 was issued to Rockall as a result of this activation.

In 2010, it was revealed that the plaque had gone missing. An Englishman, Andy Strangeway, announced his intention to land on the island and affix a replacement plaque in June 2010. The Western Isles Council have approved planning permission for the plaque. The 2010 expedition was cancelled, but Strangeway still intends to replace the plaque.

In October 2011 a group of amateur radio (ham radio) operators from Belgium travelled by ship to Rockall. Several of them climbed up the rocks and set up a radio station for some hours. They stayed overnight on top of the island. Radio contacts to all over the world were made using HF frequencies under the call sign "MM0RAI/P".

In 2013 an occupation of the island by explorer Nick Hancock to raise money for the charity Help for Heroes was planned. The challenge was to land on Rockall and survive solo for 60 days. On 31 May 2013, Hancock, and a TV crew from BBC's The One Show, sailed to the islet aboard Orca III, and he made his first unsuccessful attempt to land on the islet. The weather conditions at the time "were not favourable" according to a Maritime and Coastguard Agency official. Subsequently, Hancock postponed his challenge until 2014. On 5 June 2014 Hancock landed on Rockall to begin his 60-day survival. Despite being forced to cut his 60-day goal short after losing supplies in a storm, Hancock did remain on the island for 45 days, beating McClean's occupancy record by five days.

The "Round Rockall" sailing race, sponsored by Galway Bay Sailing Club, runs from Galway, Ireland, around Rockall and back. It was held in 2012 to coincide with the finish of the 2011–12 Volvo Ocean Race around the world.

The 2015–2016 Clipper Round the World Yacht Race race 12 from New York to Derry was extended around Rockall despite previous promises to crew from Sir Robin Knox-Johnston that this would not happen again after the race to Danang.

In 2017, the Safehaven Marine team led by Frank Kowalski set a world record for the Long Way Round Circumnavigation of Ireland via Rockall island. The Baracuda-style naval patrol, search and rescue vessel, Thunder Child, completed the route in 34 hours, 1 minute, and 47 seconds. Set in an anti-clockwise direction, the new record – the first of its kind – is now subject to ratification by Irish Sailing and the Union Internationale Motonautique, the world governing board for all powerboat activity.

Geography

Its location was precisely determined by Nick Hancock during his 2014 expedition. The surrounding elevated seabed is called the Rockall Bank, lying directly south from an area known as the Rockall Plateau. It is separated from the Outer Hebrides by the Rockall Trough, itself located within the Rockall Basin (also known as the "Hatton Rockall Basin").

In 1956 the British scientist James Fisher referred to the island as "the most isolated small rock in the oceans of the world". The neighbouring Hasselwood Rock and several other pinnacles of the surrounding Helen's Reef are smaller, at half the size of Rockall or less, and equally remote, but those formations are legally not islands or points on land, as they are often submerged completely, only revealed momentarily above certain types of ocean surface waves.

It is often washed over by large storm waves, particularly in winter. It is the only named geographical location on the rock.

North Uist is part of Na h-Eileanan Siar council area of Scotland.

The exact position of Rockall and the size and shape of the Rockall Bank was first charted in 1831 by Captain A. T. E. Vidal, a Royal Navy surveyor. The first scientific expedition to Rockall was led by Miller Christy in 1896 when the Royal Irish Academy sponsored a study of the flora and fauna. They chartered the Granuaile.

A detailed underwater mapping of the area around Rockall undertaken in 2011–2012 by Marine Scotland showed that Rockall itself is a minor pinnacle, whilst Helen's Reef extends in a sweeping arc of fissures and ridges to the north-west of the islet. Between the islet and Helen's Reef is a deeper trench much used by squid fishermen.

Rockall is located in the pathway of the warming and moderating Gulf Stream. Although the rock does not sustain any weather station, the isolated nature of the setting dictates an extremely maritime climate without heat or cold extremes.

Geology

Rockall is made of a type of peralkaline granite that is relatively rich in sodium and potassium. Within this granite are darker bands richer in iron because they contain two iron-sodium silicate minerals called aegirine and riebeckite. The darker bands are a type of granite that geologists have named "rockallite", although use of this term is now discouraged.

In 1975, a mineral new to science was discovered in a rock sample from Rockall. The mineral is called bazirite, named after the chemical elements barium and zirconium. Bazirite has the chemical formula BaZrSi3O9.

Rockall forms part of the deeply eroded Rockall Igneous Centre that was formed as part of the North Atlantic Igneous Province. It was formed approximately 52 ± 8 million years ago based on rubidium–strontium dating, as part of the breakup of Laurasia. Greenland and Europe separated and the northeast Atlantic Ocean was formed between them, eventually leaving Rockall as an isolated islet.

The RV Celtic Explorer surveyed the Rockall Bank in 2003. The Irish Light Vessel Granuaile (the same name as the steamer on the RIA 1896 botany survey) was chartered by the Geological Survey of Ireland, on behalf of the Department of Communications, Marine and Natural Resources, to conduct a seismic survey of the Rockall Bank and the Hatton Bank in July 2004, as part of the Irish National Seabed Survey.

Ecology 
The island's only permanent macro-organism inhabitants are common periwinkles and other marine molluscs. Small numbers of seabirds, mainly fulmars, northern gannets, black-legged kittiwakes, and common guillemots, use the rock for resting in summer, and gannets and guillemots occasionally breed successfully if the summer is calm with no storm waves washing over the rock. In total there have been just over twenty species of seabird and six other animal species observed (including the aforementioned molluscs) on or near the islet.

Cold-water coral biogenic reefs have been identified on the wider Rockall Bank, which are contributing features for the East Rockall Bank and North-West Rockall Bank SACs.

Discovery of new species
In December 2013 surveys by Marine Scotland discovered four new species of animals in the sea around Rockall. These are believed to live in an area where hydrocarbons are released from the sea bed, known as a cold seep. The discovery has raised the issue of restricting some forms of fishery to protect the sea bed. The species are:
 Thyasira scotiana Zelaya, 2009 – a clam
 Isorropodon mackayi – a clam in the order Veneroida
 Antonbruunia sociabilis sp. – a marine worm in the order Phyllodocida

Claims and ownership

Ireland

Irish claims to Rockall are based on its proximity to the Irish mainland; however, the country has never formally claimed sovereignty over the rock. Although Rockall is closer to the UK coast than to the Irish coast, Ireland does not recognise the UK's territorial claim to Rockall, "which would be the basis for a claim to a 12-mile territorial sea".

Ireland regards Rockall as irrelevant when determining the boundaries of the Exclusive Economic Zones (EEZ) as the rock is uninhabitable and in signing the United Nations Convention on the Law of the Sea (UNCLOS) in 1997, the UK has agreed that "Rocks which cannot sustain human habitation or economic life of their own shall have no exclusive economic zone or continental shelf".

In 1988, Ireland and the United Kingdom signed an EEZ boundary agreement, ignoring the rock per UNCLOS. With effect from 31 March 2014, the UK and Ireland published EEZ limits which include Rockall within the UK's EEZ.

In October 2012, the Irish Independent published a picture of the Irish Navy ship LÉ Róisín sailing past Rockall conducting routine maritime security patrols, and claimed that it was exercising Ireland's sovereign rights over the rock.

United Kingdom 

The UK claims Rockall along with a  territorial sea around the islet inside the country's exclusive economic zone (EEZ). The UK also claims "a circle of UK sovereign airspace over the islet of Rockall".

The UK claimed Rockall on 18 September 1955 when "Two Royal Marines and a civilian naturalist, led by Royal Navy officer Lieutenant Commander Desmond Scott, raised a Union flag on the islet and cemented a plaque into the rock". Prior to this Rockall was legally terra nullius. In 1972, the British Island of Rockall Act formally annexed Rockall to the United Kingdom.

The UK considers the rock administratively part of the Isle of Harris and, under the Scottish Adjacent Waters Boundaries Order 1999 a large sea area around it was declared to be under the jurisdiction of Scots law. A navigational beacon was installed on the island in 1982 and the UK declared that no ship would be allowed within a  radius of the rock. However, in 1997, the UK ratified the United Nations Convention on the Law of the Sea (UNCLOS), limiting territorial sea claims to a  radius, and therefore allowing free passage in waters beyond this.

In 1988, the United Kingdom and Ireland signed an EEZ boundary agreement for which "the location of Rockall was irrelevant to the determination of the boundary". In 1997, the UK ratified UNCLOS, which states that "Rocks which cannot sustain human habitation or economic life of their own shall have no exclusive economic zone or continental shelf".

As the rock lies within the United Kingdom's EEZ, the UK has sovereign rights for the purpose of exploring and exploiting, conserving and managing the natural resources of the area, including jurisdiction over the protection and preservation of the marine environment.

In May 2017, declassified documents revealed that the 1955 decision to claim the rock as UK territory was motivated by worries that it could otherwise be used by "hostile agents" to spy on the future South Uist missile testing range.

Early in January 2021, after the UK left the European Union, the Northern Celt, an Irish fishing boat based out of Greencastle, County Donegal, was ordered to leave the 12-nautical-mile zone around Rockall by officers of Marine Scotland.

Shipping disasters 

There have been various disasters on the neighbouring Hasselwood Rock and Helen's Reef (the latter was named in 1830).

 1686 – a Spanish, French, or Spanish-French ship ran aground around Rockall. Several men of the crew, Spanish and French, were able to reach St. Kilda in a pinnace and save their lives. Some details of this event were recounted by Martin Martin in his A late voyage to St. Kilda, published in 1698. The ship was perhaps a fishing vessel based in the Bay of Biscay and bound for North Atlantic cod fisheries.
 1812 – a survey vessel Leonidas foundered on Helen's Reef.
 1824 – Brigantine Helen of Dundee, bound for Quebec, foundered on Helen's Reef with fatalities.
 1904 – Danish ship SS Norge foundered on Hasselwood Rock with the loss of more than 635 of its 750 passengers. This led to a proposal by D. & C. Stevenson for an unattended lightship to be moored close to the rock.

In popular culture 
 English poet Michael Roberts published a poem "Rockall" in his 1939 collection, Orion Marches. The poem describes a shipwrecked traveler on the rock.
 In the 1951 novel The Cruel Sea by Nicholas Monsarrat, the island features as the place of the final act of HMS Saltashs war. It is here the ship takes the surrender of two German U-boats on the last day of World War Two in Europe.
 The 1955 British landing, complete with the trappings such as the hoisting the flag, caused a certain amount of popular amusement, with some seeing it as a sort of farcical end to imperial expansion. The satirists Flanders and Swann sang a successful piece titled "Rockall", playing on the similarity of the word to the vulgar expression "fuck all", meaning "nothing": The fleet set sail for Rockall, Rockall, Rockall, To free the isle of Rockall, From fear of foreign foe. We sped across the planet, To find this lump of granite, One rather startled gannet; In fact, we found Rockall.
 In The Goon Show episode "Napoleon's Piano" (first broadcast October 1955), Bluebottle lands on the piano as it is floating in the English Channel, and cements a brass plate to it in the belief that it is Rockall. Rockall was the launching site for the prototype "Jet propelled guided NAAFI" in the Goon Show episode of the same name (January 1956).
 It has been suggested by several critics that Rockall is the rock which forms the setting for William Golding's 1956 novel Pincher Martin. 
 The Master, a 1957 novel by T. H. White, is set inside Rockall. 
 David Frost, when hosting the 1962-1963 BBC satirical TV programme That Was the Week That Was, recited a list of the dwindling British colonial possessions, ending with the words, "... and sweet Rockall."
 Storm Over Rockall was a 1965 novel by W. Howard Baker, part of a series of novels based on the espionage television series Danger Man.
 The Icelandic instrumental jazz-funk fusion band Mezzoforte's track Rockall was a minor hit in Europe in 1983 and was used as a signature tune by several European radio chart shows.
 The Irish folk group The Wolfe Tones made Rockall the subject of their 1976 song "Rock on, Rockall" which asserted an Irish claim to the island.
 "Ether", the opening track of the English post-punk band Gang of Four's 1979 debut album, Entertainment!, features the satirical line "There may be oil under Rockall". The bulk of the song deals with the then-ongoing Troubles in Northern Ireland and is critical of British actions there; the line alludes anticlimactically to the dispute between Ireland and the UK over Rockall.
 A club, "The Rockall Club", has been established for people who have landed there.
 In series 2, episode 2 of the television series The Ambassador, "Vacant Possession" (first broadcast 25 Apr 1999), an Irish protestor lands on Rockall and claims it for his nation, sparking a diplomatic row.
 BBC Choice broadcast two series of a topical panel show titled Good Evening Rockall in which panellists put forward events to be included in a news bulletin ostensibly targeting the island. Sue Perkins hosted the second series.
 The duo and solo project of Runrig songwriters Calum and Rory Macdonald is called The Band from Rockall.

See also 

 List of islands of Scotland
 List of outlying islands of Scotland
 Seán Dublin Bay Rockall Loftus
 Shipping Forecast

References 
Notes

Bibliography

 Coates, Richard (1990) The place-names of St Kilda. Lewiston, etc.: Edwin Mellen Press. .
 Harvie-Brown, J. A. & Buckley, T. E. (1889) A Vertebrate Fauna of the Outer Hebrides. Edinburgh. David Douglas.
 Haswell-Smith, Hamish (2004) The Scottish Islands. Edinburgh. Canongate 
 Keay, J., and Keay, J. (1994) Collins Encyclopaedia of Scotland. London. HarperCollins 
 Maclean, Charles (1977) Island on the Edge of the World: the Story of St. Kilda, Edinburgh, Canongate 
 Martin, Martin (1703) "A Voyage to St. Kilda" in A Description of The Western Islands of Scotland. Appin Regiment/Appin Historical Society. Retrieved 16 September 2008.

Further reading 
 British Birds, birds breeding on Rockall. 86: 16–17, 320–321 (1993).
 Houses of the Oireachtas, Parliament of Ireland – Tithe an Oireachtais debate with the Minister of Foreign Affairs in the Dáil Éireann, 1 November 1973.
 Martin, Martin A Description of the Western isles of Scotland (1716).

External links 

 Rockall.name – a complex website about the islet available in both English and Czech
 RockallIsland.co.uk – a website detailing the MSØIRC/p amateur radio expedition of 16 June 2005
 Rockall2011.com – a website advocating a charitable fund for soldiers based on a pending expedition to Rockall in 2011
 Rockall.be – a website on the MMØRAI/p amateur radio expedition to Rockall in 2011
 Waveland.org  – official website of the former micronation Waveland based on Rockall
 1955: Britain claims Rockall – "On This Day" story of British claim to Rockall from BBC's official website
 British journalist Ben Fogle attempts to claim Rockall
 Icelandic Ministry of Foreign Affairs map showing all parties' claims to the continental shelf around Rockall.
 Cross-section of the geology around Rockall
 Article in The Herald Scotland about the next attempt
 Article in the Press and Journal about the Rockall attempt in 2022

 
Geological type localities
Greenpeace campaigns
Individual rocks
Islands of the North Atlantic Ocean
Seabird colonies
Shipping Forecast areas
Sites of Special Scientific Interest in Western Isles South
Skerries of Scotland
Stacks of the United Kingdom
Uninhabited islands of the Outer Hebrides
Volcanoes of Europe